The 2007 Sony Ericsson International was a Tier III WTA tennis tournament held in Bangalore, India from 12 to 18 February 2007.

Finals

Singles

 Yaroslava Shvedova defeated  Mara Santangelo 6–4, 6-4

Doubles

 Chan Yung-jan /  Chuang Chia-jung defeated  Hsieh Su-wei /  Alla Kudryavtseva 6–7(4–7), 6–2, [11-9]

WTA entrants

Seeds

Other entrants
The following players received wildcards into the singles main draw:
  Sophie Ferguson
  Tara Iyer
  Shikha Uberoi

The following players received entry from the qualifying draw:
  Chan Chin-wei
  Nudnida Luangnam
  Yurika Sema
  Sun Shengnan

References

2007 WTA Tour
Bangalore Open
2007 in Indian tennis